Boris Došljak (born 4 June 1989) is a Montenegrin professional footballer who plays for Montenegrin best leagueclub Arsenal Tivat.

Career
Dosljak started his senior career with FK Zeta. After a stint with Widzew Łódź, he signed for FK Sloboda Užice in the Serbian First League in 2015, where he made fourteen league appearances and scored one goal. After that, he played for FK Bokelj, FK Lovćen, Sloboda Užice, FK Iskra Danilovgrad, and KÍ Klaksvík. In January 2022, Došljak returned to Montenegro where he signed with Arsenal Tivat.

Boris Došljak is the father of two sons, Jakov and Simon

Honours
KÍ
 Faroe Islands Premier League: 2019, 2021
 Faroe Islands Super Cup: 2020

References

External links 
 Our football player in the Faroe Islands - read his story 
 Found a spot under the football sun in a fisherman's country in northern Europe
 Ki Klakswick celebrates Boris Newcomer and the title
 Cetinje conquers Kotor 

1989 births
Living people
Montenegrin footballers
FK Zeta players
Widzew Łódź players
FK Sloboda Užice players
FK Bokelj players
FK Lovćen players
FK Iskra Danilovgrad players
Association football wingers
Serbs of Montenegro
Montenegrin expatriate footballers
Expatriate footballers in the Faroe Islands
KÍ Klaksvík players
FK Arsenal Tivat players
Faroe Islands Premier League players
Montenegrin First League players
Montenegrin Second League players
Serbian SuperLiga players
FK Zabjelo players